The  Grand National Cross Country Series is an American motorcycle racing series. The off-road race series was founded by Dave Coombs in 1975 and is sanctioned by the American Motorcyclist Association (AMA). The competition is similar to motocross but, instead of using an enclosed race track, it features extended cross-country, off-road courses of 8 to 12 miles in length and competitions lasting up to 3 hours. GNCC races are physically demanding, leading as many as 2,200 riders through tracks ranging from woods, to hills, mud, rocks, roots, motocross track sections and more. The series has classes for off-road motorcycles, ATV and eMTB vehicles. GNCC Racing is open to both professional and amateur racers in a variety of skill level and age classes. The current presenting sponsor is Specialized Bicycle Components.

2022 GNCC Events

GNCC History
The series began in 1975 when Dave Coombs was contacted by a preacher from a church in a small West Virginia town. The preacher wanted to help the economy of his struggling town by hosting a motorcycle race. Dave Coombs saw major potential in the land and thought that a grand prix style race through the town and surrounding country side would be special enough to bring visitors to the town.
	
Coombs named this race the Blackwater 100. The name "Blackwater" originated from nearby Blackwater Falls and the Blackwater River, while 100 for the number of miles in the race. The land was rugged, which would make the race itself one would be difficult for riders and their machines. The race became popular when Dave invited a group of magazine editors from California, who went back and wrote about their experiences with the rugged race. Eventually, Blackwater would become known as "America's Toughest Race".
	
Dave also promoted the first ever AMA National Hare Scramble, which was held at High Point Raceway in 1979. With the popularity of this event and the Blackwater, the Wiseco 100 Miler Series was born. The series would then evolve into the GNCC series beginning with the 1984 season. The GNCC series began experiencing more growth when three-wheelers were added in 1983, and four-wheelers replaced them a few years later.  Blackwater 100 later received an eponymous pinball adaptation manufactured by Bally-Midway in 1988, distinguished by its complex table design and its unique rule of making each of the three "balls" allotted per session multiballs that represent three "heats" of the race.
 	
The famous Blackwater 100 was shut down after the 1993 event, but by this point the GNCC series had earned the reputation as being the Premier Offroad Racing Series in America. Throughout the 90s the series would still grow more and more. With domination on the bike side by riders such as Scott Summers, Scott Plessinger and Rodney Smith, while Barry Hawk dominated the ATV side, the series gained even more mainstream coverage in various media. The series patriarch, Dave Coombs, died  in 1998 but Big Dave's family stepped up to continue the success of the series. His son-in-law, Jeff Russell, the 1991 AMA National Enduro Champion, is today's GNCC Trail Boss.
 	
GNCC Racing has evolved from small, regional races to professional-grade events that attract professional and amateur riders from across the world. Growth in the professional ranks prompted the changes from one single "Pro" class to multiple professional rank classes beginning in 2007. Professional ATV classes consist of the premier "XC1 Pro ATV" class and the "XC2 Pro-Am ATV" class to serve as a stepping stone for riders moving out of the amateur classes. Professional motorcycle classes consist of the "XC1 Open Pro" class for any size motorcycle, the "XC2 250 Pro" class for 250cc motorcycles and the "XC2 125 Pro-Am" class reserved exclusively for 125cc 2-stroke motorcycles.

Past Champions
Over the years the series has been contested by thousands of different riders across the world. Each year an Overall Champion is crowned for both the bikes and ATVs.

GNCC Overall Bike Champions

GNCC XC2 250 Pro Class Bike Champions

GNCC FMF XC3 125 Pro Am Class Bike Champions

GNCC Overall ATV Champions

GNCC XC2 Pro Am Class ATV Champions

References

External links
Official website
List of GNCC Events from 1984 – 2012
GNCC on Facebook

Grand National Cross Country
Grand National Cross Country
Rally raids
Motorsport competitions in the United States